Tri-Township Airport is a civil, public use airport located 3 miles southeast of Savanna, Illinois. It is publicly owned by the Tri-Township Municipal Airport Authority.

Facilities
The airport has one runway: runway 13/31 is 4001 x 75 ft (1220 x 23 m) and made of asphalt.

The airport manages its own fixed-based operator (FBO) on the field offering fueling services as well as rental cars.

The airport received $171,000 from the State of Illinois during the COVID-19 pandemic to install new electric airfield security gates.

Aircraft
For the 12-month period ending April 30, 2020, the airport averages 77 operations per week, or about 4000 per year. This traffic is comprised completely of general aviation. For that same time period, there are 9 aircraft based on the field: 7 single-engine airplanes, 1 multi-engine airplane, and 1 helicopter.

References 

Airports in Illinois